Arevalo may refer to:

Arévalo, a municipality in Spain
Arevalo, Iloilo City, a district of Iloilo City, Philippines
Arévalo (surname)